Archana Taide Sharma is an Indian actress. She started her career with the reality show Bollywood Ka Ticket on 9X TV. She started her writing career with the show she herself produced along with Ashish Sharma and a close friend, titled Chore Tera Gaon Bada Pyara. She is the Creative Head as a Producer at Desi Fillum Compani Pvt. Ltd.

Career
Archana played the lead role of Pavni in the show Beend Banoongaa Ghodi Chadhunga on Imagine TV. She was cast as Nikhat Ahmed Khan in Zee TV's Qubool Hai. She was last seen playing the antagonist on & TV show Santoshi Maa.

Personal life
Taide was born into a Maharashtrian Christian family to Anand Taide and Kiran Taide. She attended Our Lady of Good Counsel High School, Sion, Mumbai. On 30 January 2013, she married actor Ashish Sharma in Jaipur. The couple were introduced to each other by a mutual friend in Baroda where they were shooting for separate shows.

Television

References

External links
 

Living people
1988 births
Indian television actresses
Indian women television presenters
Indian television presenters
Indian Christians
Actresses from Hyderabad, India